U.S. WeChat Users Alliance (USWUA) v. Trump is a court case pending before the United States District Court for the Northern District of California. The plaintiffs won a preliminary injunction on September 20, 2020, blocking the Trump administration's ban order against WeChat based on concerns raised about harm to First Amendment rights and the hardships imposed on a minority community using the app as a primary means of communication.

Background
WeChat is a highly popular social media app in China. Many American families depend on WeChat as a means of communicating with family and friends in China.

On August 6, 2020, U.S. President Donald Trump signed an executive order, invoking the International Emergency Economic Powers Act, seeking to ban WeChat in the U.S. in 45 days, due to its connections with the Chinese-owned Tencent. This was signed alongside a similar executive order targeting TikTok (TikTok v. Trump) and its Chinese-owned ByteDance. Following the EO, the Department of Commerce issued orders on September 18, 2020, to enact the ban on WeChat and TikTok by the end of September 20, 2020, citing national security and data privacy concerns.

Plaintiff
The plaintiff is the U.S. WeChat Users Alliance is a non-profit. The alliance's trustees are described by the New York Times as including "several prominent Chinese-American lawyers". The group says it is not connected to Tencent.

Proceedings
Magistrate Judge Laurel Beeler of the United States District Court for the Northern District of California issued a preliminary injunction blocking the Department of Commerce order on WeChat on September 20, 2020, citing the merits of the plaintiffs' First Amendment claims. The U.S. Justice Department appealed this injunction on 2 October 2020, calling judge Beeler's decision an "error". On October 23, judge Beeler said the new evidence presented by the U.S. Justice Department in early October did not change her mind regarding her injunction of the White House order. On December 23, the Trump administration asked the court to drop the U.S. WeChat Users Alliance v. Trump case to follow through on its ban of WeChat.

On 31 December 2020, the NYSE announced it would apply a White House order banning three Chinese telecom companies from US trading floors, including Alipay and WeChat Pay. Then, in early January 2021, Donald Trump issued an order to ban a total of 8 mobile apps on US soils, WeChat included, but the order would become effective under the Biden administration.

See also
TikTok v. Trump

References

External links
 USWUA official website

Donald Trump litigation
China–United States relations
WeChat
United States District Court for the Northern District of California cases